Heeley is a former cluster of villages now a suburb in the south of the City of Sheffield, England.

Heeley may also refer to:
 Heeley (UK Parliament constituency)
 Heeley F.C., a former English association football club in Sheffield, Yorkshire
 Heeley railway station, a former railway station in Sheffield, England
 Queen of Heeley (1855–1925), popular name of Felicia Dorothea Kate Dover who was convicted of manslaughter in 1882

See also
 Healey (disambiguation)